William Becklean (born June 23, 1936) is an American competition rower and Olympic champion.

Becklean was born in Kansas City, Missouri, and attended Phillips Exeter Academy. He received a gold medal in eights with the American team at the 1956 Summer Olympics in Melbourne.

He would compete for Yale University and would receive an MBA from Harvard Business School.

References

External links

1936 births
Living people
Olympic gold medalists for the United States in rowing
Rowers at the 1956 Summer Olympics
American male rowers
Medalists at the 1956 Summer Olympics
Coxswains (rowing)
Phillips Exeter Academy alumni
Yale Bulldogs rowers
Harvard Business School alumni